Maiara Walsh (born February 18, 1988) is an American actress and singer. She played Ana Solis on the sixth season of the ABC show Desperate Housewives, Meena Paroom on the Disney Channel sitcom Cory in the House and Simone Sinclair on the ABC Family series Switched at Birth. She also portrayed Vicky Patterson in the film Identity Theft of a Cheerleader by Lifetime.

Early life
Walsh was born in Seattle, Washington, to a Brazilian mother and an American father. Her family moved to São Paulo, Brazil when she was one year old  where Portuguese became her first language. After a few years, they moved back to Seattle where Maiara took an interest in music and the arts, diving into every musical and play offered by her school. At 11, she moved to Simi Valley, California to pursue her acting career and graduated from Royal High School.

Career
In  2010, Walsh guest-starred on CW's The Vampire Diaries as Sarah. In 2011 she co-starred in Mean Girls 2 as Mandi Weatherly, an A-list cliché girl also known as a "Plastic". Walsh was also on the Dr. Phil Show.

Walsh was the female lead in the television series Zombieland as Wichita, taking over the role from Emma Stone. After the pilot episode, the series was not picked up.

Walsh had a recurring part starting in 2012 as Simone Sinclair, a former friend of Bay Kennish, a one-night stand with Emmett Bledsoe, friend / ex-girlfriend of Toby Kennish, and ex-girlfriend of Wilkie, in Switched at Birth.

In 2019, Walsh starred in the Lifetime film Identity Theft of a Cheerleader as Vicky Patterson who was modeled after the real-life case of Wendy Brown. In 2020, she starred in Lifetime original movie Killer Dream Home alongside John DeLuca.

Filmography

Film

Television

Music videos

References

External links

 
 
 

1988 births
Living people
Actresses from Seattle
American people of Brazilian descent
American television actresses
American emigrants to Brazil
American child actresses
American film actresses
Actresses of Brazilian descent
21st-century American actresses
21st-century American singers
People from São Paulo
Hispanic and Latino American actresses
Brazilian actors
Brazilian actresses
Brazilian American